Paul M. Kimelman (born 1947) A motivational speaker in the 1980s and early 1990s, he held the Guinness World Record for the greatest weight-loss in the shortest amount of time and was featured on the book's cover in 1982. Kimelman traveled the world and spoke about his experience.

The record
A native of the Bronx, NY, Paul moved to Pittsburgh, Pennsylvania with his father, Olga Kimelman, in the early 1960s.  As a 19-year-old, Paul reached his peak weight; more than 520 pounds (235 kg). Starting in 1967, as a New Year's resolution, he decided to start fasting to lose weight because he was tired of being ridiculed. In an interview posted in the Boca Raton News on March 22, 1981, Paul made this statement on the resolution, "I quit eating right there. I fasted for as long as I could, then after that it was just clear soups, grapefruit juice, skim milk, and salads." Paul shed a little over 355 pounds (161 kg) in 7 months, dropping from 487 to 130 pounds (221 to 59 kg). His achievement was recognized by The Guinness Book of World Records. Not only did he hold the Record for more than 12 years, he was also on the cover of the book in 1982.

Book
Life in the Fat Lane:  The Paul Kimelman Story, with David Wolfson. Fat Lane Publications (1991)

References

Living people
People from the Bronx
1946 births
People from Pittsburgh
American motivational speakers
American autobiographers